The RML 64-pounder 71 cwt guns (converted) were British rifled muzzle-loading guns converted from obsolete smoothbore 8-inch 65 cwt shell guns in the 1860s-1870s.

Design 

When Britain adopted rifled ordnance in the 1860s it still had large stocks of serviceable but now obsolete smoothbore guns. Gun barrels were expensive to manufacture, so the best and most recent models were selected for conversion to rifled guns, for use as second-line ordnance, using a technique designed by William Palliser. The Palliser conversion was based on what was accepted as a sound principle that the strongest material in the barrel construction should be innermost, and hence a new tube of stronger wrought iron was inserted in the old cast iron barrel, rather than attempting to reinforce the old barrel from the outside.

This gun was based on the cast-iron barrel of the Millar Pattern 8-inch 65 cwt gun, originally designed in 1834. This was designed to fire a smooth bore spherical shell weighing 50 pounds. The 8-inch gun was bored out to 10.5 inches and a new built-up wrought iron inner tube with inner diameter of 6.29 inches was inserted and fastened in place. The gun was then rifled with 3 grooves, with a uniform twist of 1 turn in 40 calibres (i.e. 1 turn in 252 inches), and proof fired. The proof firing also served to expand the new tube slightly and ensure a tight fit in the old iron tube.

Ammunition 

The 64-pounder used three types of ammunition. This ammunition was common to the other natures of 64 pounder gun - the 58 cwt converted gun and the 64 cwt gun. Although issued for sea service and many being sited on coastal artillery positions, their effectiveness again armour of heavily armoured ships was limited.  Common shell could be used against buildings or fortifications, shrapnel shell (for use any Infantry or Cavalry) and case shot (for close range use against 'soft' targets. Ignition was through a copper lined vent at the breech end of the gun. A copper friction tube would be inserted and a lanyard attached. When the lanyard was pulled the tube would ignite, firing the gun. A number of different fuzes could be used enabling shells to either burst at a pre-determined time (and range), or on impact.

Guns were fired using a silk bag containing a black powder propellant. A typical rate of fire was one round every three minutes.

Deployment 

This nature of gun was initially issued for Sea Service (SS), but by 1886 were obsolete in that role and were being returned to store for re-issue for Land Service (LS). In Naval service they were deployed on many smaller British cruising warships around the world.

In Land service many were mounted for coast defence in both British and colonial locations. They were mounted on a wide variety of iron and wooden carriages. They became obsolete for coast artillery use in 1902, whereupon most of them were scrapped and disposed of.

See also 
 RML 64-pounder 64 cwt gun the equivalent new design frontline 64-pounder gun
 List of naval guns

Surviving examples 
 Gun number 142, dated 1869 at St Helier, Jersey
 Gun numbers 398 and 407 at the Royal Australian Artillery Memorial, Mount Pleasant, Canberra, Australia
 Gun number 483, dated 1870. One of two at the Old Battery, Dartmouth Castle, Devon, UK
 Gun number 574, dated 1871 at the Royal Armouries, Fort Nelson, Hampshire
 Gun number 581, dated 1871 at the Royal Armouries, Fort Nelson
 Gun number 681, dated 1871, Royal Armouries, Fort Nelson, Hampshire
 Gun number 709, dated 1872 at Southsea Castle, UK
 Gun number 721, dated 1874 at the old battery, Dartmouth Castle, Devon
 A gun at Mays Hill Cemetery, Parramatta, New South Wales, Australia
 A gun outside the wardroom at HMNZS Philomel, Auckland, New Zealand
 A gun on a locally-made carriage at Army Memorial Museum, Waiouru, New Zealand
 Gun at Fort St. Catherine, St George, Bermuda

Notes

References

Bibliography 
 Treatise on the Construction and Manufacture of Ordnance in the British Service. War Office, UK, 1879

External links 

 Handbook for the 64 – pr. R. M. L. converted guns of 58 and 71 cwt. L. S., 1887, 1892, 1898, 1902 at State Library of Victoria
 WL Ruffell, RML 64-pr 71-cwt

Naval guns of the United Kingdom
160 mm artillery
Coastal artillery
Victorian-era weapons of the United Kingdom